The Chuya is a tributary of the Katun, in Altai Republic, Russia.

Chuya may also refer to:

 Chuya (Irkutsk Oblast), a village at the mouth of the Chuya river, Irkutsk Oblast, Russia
 Chuya (river), a tributary of the Lena, in Buryatia and Irkutsk Oblast, Russia
 Chuya Belki, a mountainous region in the Altai Mountains
 Chuya Steppe, an intermontane basin in the Altai Mountains
 Chūya Nakahara (1907–1937), Japanese poet

See also
 Chuja (disambiguation)